Manipur State Constitution Act 1947 is an act which enabled Manipur State to have a dejure written constitution enacted by the last Maharajah of Manipur Bodhchandra Singh. The validity of the act in present time is debated.

Background 
After the 1891 rebellion in Manipur, the British took direct control of the state's administration. While the Maharaja was retained the Maharaja as a nominal head of state, the real power rested with the British Political Agent and an official appointed as the President of the Durbar. The hill regions, populated by Naga and Kuki tribes, were taken out of the jurisdiction of the Maharaja and administered by the President using Assam regulations.

In 1934, Nikhil Manipuri Mahsabha (NMM) was established by Hijam Irabot with the-then Maharajah Churachand Singh as President. By 1938 it had become a prominent political front advocating the democratization of the powers held by the Durbar and an overhaul of the corrupt colonial administration. Proposals for reforms were twice submitted to the Durbar in 1938 and 1939. They called for abolition of exploitative taxes, reunification of the hills with the valley, establishment of self-rule, installation of a Panchayat system, and the establishment of a unicameral legislature based on suffrage.

Fissures between the royal house and NMM were also prominent; NMM was declared a political party whereby no state government employee could participate in it and Irabot had to resign from the Sadar Court. In the ensuing deliberations, Churachand and the President of the Durbar F. F. Pearson declined the demands of NMM, claiming that Manipur was not "ripe for democracy". Popular resistance continued — the Second Nupi Lan would play a significant role in mobilizing anti-feudal sentiments in the masses.

Maharaja Bodhchandra Singh ascended the throne in November 1941, on Churachand's death. Whilst the political scene was quiet during World War II, after the war, he was subject to a protracted and vigorous resistance from multiple political parties — Irabot's Manipur Krishak Sabha (MKS), Manipur State Congress allied to the Indian National Congress, Manipur Praja Sangha etc. In August 1946, NMM passed a resolution urging for the immediate establishment of a constitution-drafting machinery. Krishak Sabha and Praja Sangha demanded a "responsible" government in multiple meetings, throughout the year. Finally, on the advise of Cabinet Mission, Bodhchandra consented to the formation of a 15 member Constitution Making Committee in December 1946.

Constitution-making 
The Constitution Making Committee had five members selected from a consultation with "educated men" of the Hills, five members were elected from the valley, two members were nominated by the Maharajah and Chairman of the Chief Court, and the remaining three were nominated by the Durbar. Overall, the committee was dominated by Congress men and their sympathizers. President of the Durbar, Pearson became the Chairman. Krishak Sabha as well as Praja Sangha had criticized the composition-rules as undemocratic and boycotted elections to the committee.

The commission took office in February 1947 and was formally inaugurated on 3 March. On, 10 March, the Maharajah addressed it in a public ceremony. The first meeting was held on 24 March 1947 and on 29 March, broad resolutions were adopted on the central features of the would-be constitution. The final version of the constitution was passed by the committee on 8 May 1947. The draft was soon vetted by the Durbar and on receiving Bodhchandra's consent, was enacted as the Manipur State Constitution Act 1947 on 27 July 1947.

Reference

Bibliography

Further reading 
 
 
 

Constitutional law
Democracy
History of Manipur
1947 in law